Oleksandr Mykolayovych Rzhavsky (30 January 1959 – 27 March 2022) was a pro-Russian Ukrainian politician who served as a member of the Verkhovna Rada (Ukrainian parliament) from 1998 until 2002.

Rzhavsky was also candidate in the 2004 Ukrainian presidential election, nominated by the "United Family" Party, of which he was the head. Presidential candidate in 1999, when he won 0.37% of the votes, and finished in 9th place.

He was vice-chair of the board of Montazhspetsbank in 1996–97, and president of Koral Bank in 1997–98. In his program, he promised to establish order in Ukraine, using the methods of Russian President Vladimir Putin.

He was killed during the 2022 Russian invasion of Ukraine by Russian forces at his home in Bucha, Kyiv Oblast, as part of the Bucha massacre.

References

1959 births
2022 deaths
People from Kramatorsk
Candidates in the 1999 Ukrainian presidential election
Candidates in the 2004 Ukrainian presidential election
People murdered in Ukraine
People killed in the 2022 Russian invasion of Ukraine
Civilians killed in the Russian invasion of Ukraine
Third convocation members of the Verkhovna Rada